Verwood Town Football Club are a football club based in Verwood, Dorset, England. The club is affiliated to the Dorset County Football Association and is a FA chartered Standard club. Long term manager Adie Arnold resigned from his post in March 2014, ending an -year association with the club. After a succession of management changes Adie Arnold came back to manage the club once again for a period through to December 2021. Shepherd & Tabor were appointed on the 3rd January 2022 and went on to win their first game in charge 2-3 away to local rivals Ringwood Town on the same day.

History
The club was founded in 1905. They had entered the Hampshire League before 1989, and were runners-up in Division One in 2002–03. They were among the founding members of Wessex League Division Three in 2004. They were placed in Division one upon reorganisation and won the league in 2011–12 gaining promotion to the Wessex League Premier Division.

Ground

Verwood Town play their home games at Potterne Park, Potterne Way, Verwood, BH21 6RS.

The club have covered seating and a covered terrace plus a refreshment bar.

Honours
Wessex League Division One
Champions 2011–12
Hampshire League Division One
Runners-up 2002–03

Records
FA Cup
Extra Preliminary Round 2010–11, 2011–12, 2012–13
FA Vase
Third Round 2010–11

References
 3. Darren Shepherd & Danny Tabor appointed Co-Managers at Verwood Town FC. https://www.bournemouthecho.co.uk/sport/19822568.verwood-appoint-darren-shepherd-danny-tabor-co-managers/

External links
Official club website

Wessex Football League
Association football clubs established in 1920
Football clubs in Dorset
1920 establishments in England
Football clubs in England
Verwood